Momčilo Cemović (21 May 1928, in Berane, Zeta Banovina, Kingdom of Serbs, Croats and Slovenes – 27 December 2001, in Podgorica, FR Yugoslavia) was Montenegrin politician.

Political career
He served as the President of the Executive Council of the Socialist Republic of Montenegro from 1978 until 1982. Cemović was a member of the League of Communists of Montenegro and League of Communists of Yugoslavia. He was also a Finance Minister of Yugoslavia from 1974 to 1978.

References

1928 births
2001 deaths
People from Berane
Vasojevići
Finance ministers of Yugoslavia
League of Communists of Montenegro politicians
Montenegrin communists